Ace Atkins (born June 28, 1970) is an American journalist and author. He became a full-time novelist at the age of 30.

Biography
Born in 1970, Atkins is the son of NFL player Billy Atkins.

Atkins lettered for the Auburn University football team in 1992 and 1993.

Atkins was featured on the Sports Illustrated cover commemorating the Tigers' perfect 11-0 season of 1993. The cover shows Atkins celebrating after sacking future Heisman Trophy winner Danny Wuerffel of the Florida Gators. Atkins wore number 99 for the Tigers.

Atkins graduated from Auburn University in 1994.

Atkins worked as a crime reporter in the newsroom of The Tampa Tribune before he published his first novel, Crossroad Blues (1998).

While at the Tribune, Atkins earned a Pulitzer Prize nomination for a feature series based on his investigation into a forgotten murder of the 1950s. The story became the core of his critically acclaimed novel, White Shadow, which was commented on positively by noted authors and critics. In his next novels, Wicked City and Devil's Garden, Atkins continued this kind of story-telling, a style that was compared to that of Dennis Lehane and George Pelecanos.

White Shadow (2006), Wicked City (2008), and Devil's Garden (2009) are personal books for Atkins, all set in his former homes: San Francisco, where he lived as a child; Alabama, his family's home and where he was born and went to college; and Tampa, where he embarked on his career as a writer. Each novel contains bits of himself – friends and colleagues he once knew, people he respected or admired, family members, and personal heroes. In Devil's Garden, Atkins explores the early life of one of those heroes: Dashiell Hammett, the originator of the hard-boiled crime novel. As a Pinkerton Agency detective, Hammett investigated the rape and manslaughter case against early Hollywood star Roscoe Arbuckle, one of the most sensational trials of the 20th Century.  Atkins' novel Infamous (2010) is based on the 1933 Charles Urschel kidnapping and subsequent misadventures of the gangster couple George "Machine Gun" and Kathryn Kelly.

In 2011, Atkins was selected by the estate of Robert B. Parker to take over writing the Spenser series of novels. The Boston Globe wrote that while some people might have "viewed the move as unseemly, those people didn't know Robert B. Parker, a man who, when asked how his books would be viewed in 50 years, replied: 'Don't know, don't care.' He was proud of his work, but he mainly saw writing as a means of providing a comfortable life for his family."

Atkins has been living on a historic farm outside Oxford, Mississippi with his family.

Novels

Nick Travers
Crossroad Blues (1998)
Leavin' Trunk Blues (2000)
Dark End of the Street (2002)
Dirty South (2004)

Quinn Colson
The Ranger (2011)
The Lost Ones (2012)
The Broken Places (2013)
The Forsaken (2014)
The Redeemers (2015)
The Innocents (2016)
The Fallen (2017)
The Sinners (2018)
The Shameless (2019)
The Revelators (2020)
The Heathens (2021)

Robert B. Parker's Spenser
Robert B. Parker's Lullaby (2012)
Robert B. Parker's Wonderland (2013)
Robert B. Parker's Cheap Shot (2014)
Robert B. Parker's Kickback (2015)
Robert B. Parker's Slow Burn (2016)
Robert B. Parker's Little White Lies (2017)
Robert B. Parker's Old Black Magic (2018)
Robert B. Parker's Angel Eyes (2019)
Robert B. Parker’s Someone To Watch Over Me (2020)
Robert B. Parker's Bye Bye Baby (2022)

Stand Alone Novels
White Shadow (2006) 400 pages 
Wicked City (2008) 368 pages 
Devil's Garden (2009) 368 pages 
Infamous (2010) 416 pages

See also
List of Auburn University people

References

External links
 Official website
 Author page, UK publisher (No Exit Press)

1970 births
Living people
American crime fiction writers
American male novelists
American non-fiction crime writers
Auburn High School (Alabama) alumni
Auburn University alumni
Auburn Tigers football players
20th-century American novelists
20th-century American male writers
21st-century American novelists
People from Oxford, Mississippi
Novelists from Mississippi
21st-century American male writers
20th-century American non-fiction writers
21st-century American non-fiction writers
American male non-fiction writers